Julian Ocleppo and Andrea Vavassori were the defending champions but only Vavassori chose to defend his title, partnering Andrea Pellegrino. Vavassori lost in the semifinals to Ivan and Matej Sabanov.

Sabanov and Sabanov won the title after defeating Sergio Galdós and Juan Pablo Varillas 6–4, 4–6, [10–5] in the final.

Seeds

Draw

References

External links
 Main draw

San Benedetto Tennis Cup - Doubles
2019 Doubles